Steven Craig Register (born May 16, 1983) is an American former professional baseball pitcher.

Career
The New York Mets selected him in the Rule 5 Draft from the Rockies in December , and he was added to their 40-man roster.

He was sent back to the Rockies on March 28, 2008. On August 4, he was called up to the MLB by the Colorado Rockies. On May 20, 2009, Register was claimed off waivers by the Philadelphia Phillies. He was called up to the majors on July 25, 2009.

On January 19, 2010, Register signed a minor league deal with the Toronto Blue Jays with an invite to 2010 Spring Training.

References

External links

1983 births
Living people
Baseball players at the 2003 Pan American Games
Baseball players from Columbus, Georgia
Colorado Rockies players
Colorado Springs Sky Sox players
Major League Baseball pitchers
Modesto Nuts players
Pan American Games medalists in baseball
Pan American Games silver medalists for the United States
Philadelphia Phillies players
Tri-City Dust Devils players
Tulsa Drillers players
United States national baseball team players
Medalists at the 2003 Pan American Games